Rebecca Grace Parkes (born August 16, 1994) is a Hungarian water polo player originally from New Zealand. At the 2020 Summer Olympics she competed for the Hungary women's national water polo team in the women's tournament.

She plays for the 2021-22 season for Greek club Ethnikos with whom she won the 2022 LEN Trophy.

References

External links
 

1994 births
Living people
Hungarian female water polo players
Water polo players at the 2020 Summer Olympics
Universiade medalists in water polo
Universiade silver medalists for Hungary
Medalists at the 2017 Summer Universiade
Medalists at the 2020 Summer Olympics
Olympic bronze medalists for Hungary in water polo
Sportspeople from Hamilton, New Zealand
World Aquatics Championships medalists in water polo
Ethnikos Piraeus Water Polo Club players
21st-century Hungarian women
Expatriate water polo players
Hungarian expatriate sportspeople in Greece
Naturalized citizens of Hungary
New Zealand expatriate sportspeople in Greece
New Zealand female water polo players
Naturalised sports competitors